Ben McEnroe is an American football coach. He is the head football coach at Grace Community School in Tyler, Texas, a position he had held since 2021. McEnroe served as the head football coach at California Lutheran University in Thousand Oaks, California, from 2007 to 2021, compiling a record of 74–48. Prior to coaching at Cal Lutheran, he was the head football coach at Chaminade College Preparatory School in West Hills, California from 2003 to 2006.

Playing career
As a player, McEnroe played as a linebacker and an offensive lineman at Taft Union High School in Taft, California from 1984 to 1987. During high school, he earned First Team All-SSL Offense and Defense and was picked to the Bakersfield Californian All-Area team. During his high school career, he was also voted the Most Valuable Lineman and Team Captain. In 1989, he played for Bakersfield College before playing for the Cal Lutheran Kingsmen during the 1991 and 1992 seasons. At Cal Lutheran, he received First Team All-SCIAC at Center and also Most Inspirational Player honors as team captain for the football team in his senior year. In his senior year, 1992, he was also named to the All-SCIAC first team.

Coaching career
He started his career as an offensive line coach right after college. He was the offensive line coach at Cal Lutheran from 1993-1998. In 2003, he became Head Coach for the Chaminade College Prep High School in West Hills, CA. He led the program there to the CIF playoffs four times and earned a 2006 league title. Several of his former Chaminade players have enjoyed professional sports careers, including Logan Paulsen for the San Francisco 49ers, Ryan Griffin for the Tampa Bay Buccaneers, and Kevin Pillar for the Toronto Jays.

McEnroe was the offensive line coach at Humboldt State University in 1999-2003 and was chosen football coach at West Hills Chaminade in 2003. He had been a coach at West Hills Chaminade High School the last four years when he was hired at California Lutheran University in 2007. After over ten years of coaching, he became the fourth head football coach in the history of Cal Lutheran. In his four years as coach of the Chaminade Eagles, the team compiled a 32-16 record with four consecutive CIF playoff appearances and a top 10 ranking each year. The team won the Mission League Championship and advanced to the CIF semifinals.

At Cal Lutheran, Ben McEnroe has led the Kingsmen to four conference titles, including consecutive SCIAC championships in 2009, 2010, and 2011.

Personal life
His wife, Kami, is a coach for the California Lutheran University's cheerleading squad. They met at Bakersfield College, where Ben played and Kami was a cheerleader. McEnroe has been married to Kami since 1985, and they have three children, Kassidy, Cory and Kylie. He earned a bachelor's degree in history (1993) and a Master of Arts degree in education (1999) from Cal Lutheran.

Head coaching record

College

References

Year of birth missing (living people)
Living people
American football centers
Bakersfield Renegades football players
Cal Lutheran Kingsmen football coaches
Cal Lutheran Kingsmen football players
Humboldt State Lumberjacks football coaches
High school football coaches in California
People from Taft, California
Coaches of American football from California
Players of American football from California